Changiyeh-ye Qajar (also Romanized as Changīyeh-ye Qajar; also known as Changīyeh, Changīyeh Gāvdārī, and Gāvdārī-ye Changīyeh) is a village in Mishkhas Rural District, in the Sivan District of Ilam County, Ilam Province, Iran. At the 2006 census, its population was 321, in 73 families. The village is populated by Kurds.

References 

Populated places in Ilam County
Kurdish settlements in Ilam Province